David Penalva (born 26 January 1980 in France) is a Portuguese rugby union footballer. He plays as a lock.

Penalva played for Nice, in the French Fédérale 1, for the 2010-11 season.

He had 35 caps for Portugal, from 2002 to 2012, scoring 1 try, 5 points on aggregate. Penalva made his debut for the national side on 3 March 2002, in a 13-10 win over Spain, in Caldas da Rainha for the Six Nations B. 
He was called for the 2007 Rugby World Cup, playing in all the four games and scoring a try in the third game against Italy in a 31-5 loss. That would be the single points of his international career. Penalva most recent game was at 10 March 2012, in a 23-17 win over Spain, in Coimbra, for the Six Nations B. He has been absent from the National Team since then.

References

External links
David Penalva International Statistics

1980 births
Living people
Citizens of Portugal through descent
Portuguese rugby union players
Portugal international rugby union players
French rugby union players
French people of Portuguese descent
Rugby union locks